The 2017 Wales Rally (formally the 73. Dayinsure Wales Rally GB) was the 12th round of the 2017 World Rally Championship. The rally was being held over four days between 26 October and 29 October 2017, and was based in Deeside, United Kingdom. Britons Elfyn Evans and Daniel Barritt won the rally on their home soil, which marked their first success in the WRC.

Sébastien Ogier and Julien Ingrassia finished the rally in third position which was enough to seal the drivers' title. M-Sport secured their first manufacturers' championship as a private team and its first since winning with Ford in 2007.

Entry list

Classification

Event standings

Special stages

Power Stage
The Power Stage was a  stage at the end of the rally.

Championship standings after the rally
Bold text indicates 2017 World Champions.

Drivers' Championship standings

Manufacturers' Championship standings

References

External links

 The official website of the World Rally Championship
 The official website of Wales Rally GB
 The official website of Dayinsure Sponsor

2017 World Rally Championship season
2017
2017 in British motorsport
2017 in Welsh sport
October 2017 sports events in the United Kingdom